The genus Hieraaetus, sometimes known as small eagles or hawk-eagles, denotes a group of smallish eagles usually placed in the accipitrid subfamilies Buteoninae or Aquilinae.

They are medium-sized birds of prey inhabiting Europe, Asia, Africa, New Guinea and Australia.

Taxonomy and species
The genus Hieraaetus was introduced in 1844 by the German naturalist Johann Jakob Kaup with the booted eagle as the type species. The name combines the Ancient Greek hierax meaning "hawk" with aetos meaning "eagle".

Molecular genetic research  has found Hieraaetus to be polyphyletic with Aquila.

Hieraaetus kienerii was found to be most distinct, and has been assigned to a separate genus, Lophotriorchis.

After DNA sequences from remains of the extinct giant Haast's eagle were found to be similar to those of the little eagle, it has been reclassified from Harpagornis moorei to the genus Hieraeetus.

The British Ornithological Union moved Bonelli's and booted eagles to Aquila in 2005, but was silent on the position of the non-European Ayres', little, and pygmy eagles. 

This could create a taxonomic problem: the booted eagle is the type species of Hieraaetus, moving it would make that name a junior synonym of Aquila. Consequently, should any other hawk-eagles be retained as a distinct group, they would need to get a different genus name. As of 2014, the BOU lists the booted eagle on their Category D and E lists as H. pennatus, not A. pennata.

Christidis and Boles (2008) used an alternative approach. Accepting that both Aquila and Hieraaetus are polyphyletic, they moved spilogaster and fasciatus to the genus Aquila and retained the other former Hieraaetus group along with morphnoides and Aquila wahlbergi within the new delimitation of Hieraaetus.

Sometimes the entire genus is merged into Aquila. This was the approach taken with The Clements Checklist between 2001 and 2009: starting in the 2001 revisions to the 5th edition, and retained in the printed 6th edition of 2007.

The Clements Checklist, in its 2009 revisions, followed the same approach as Christidis & Boles, moving Aquila wahlbergi into Hieraaetus; restoring the booted, little and Ayres' eagles back to Hieraaetus.

The pygmy eagle, or New Guinea hawk-eagle, H. morphnoides weiskei was formerly considered a subspecies of the little eagle H. morphnoides; it has been recognized as a separate species by some authorities.

The genus contains five species.

Extinct species

Former species

Some authorities retain Bonelli's eagle and the African hawk-eagle in Hieraaetus.  Also, some retain Wahlberg's eagle in Aquila, whilst still recognizing Hieraaetus as a separate genus.

Notes

References 

 Helbig AJ, Kocum A, Seibold I & Braun MJ (2005) A multi-gene phylogeny of aquiline eagles (Aves: Accipitriformes) reveals extensive paraphyly at the genus level. Molecular Phylogenetics and Evolution  35(1):147-164 PDF
 

 
Aquilinae
Bird genera